Edward Hayward Budd (23 February 1786 – 29 March 1875) was a noted English cricketer and all-round sportsman.  He was a prominent right-handed batsman and an occasional medium pace lob bowler.  He was a good fielder who played in some matches as a wicketkeeper.

Always known by his initials, E. H. Budd was one of sixteen children of William Budd and his wife Ann (née Hayward). His maternal grandfather was the Rector of Uley, in Gloucestershire. At the age of 16 he was appointed to a clerkship in the War Office, from which he retired early after approximately twenty years' service.

He first played at Lord's in about 1804 and by 1807 was frequently engaged in matches there. His height was barely 5'10" and his weight for many years was uniformly 12 stone.

Budd's first-class career was disrupted by the Napoleonic War, especially during the 1811 to 1815 seasons.  He is first recorded by Scores & Biographies in the 1802 season, in an "odds" match; and by CricketArchive in the 1803 season, in a match that is not universally regarded as first-class.  He played for All-England Eleven versus Marylebone Cricket Club in 1804 and then made sporadic appearances until 1808 when his career took off.  He continued playing until 1831.

One of his early appearances was for the Gentlemen in the second Gentlemen v Players match in 1806.

He was a member of Marylebone Cricket Club (MCC) and that was his main team, though he also played for All-England and for various occasional elevens, including his own.  He rarely played for any county teams and then only as a given man.

As with all cricketers in the first quarter of the 19th century, his full career details are uncertain but CricketArchive credits him with 73 known first-class appearances and 2,728 runs at a good average (for the time) of 23.51, with a highest score of 105.  In the field he is credited with 173 wickets, 51 catches and 27 stumpings.

C. H. Wheeler recorded that he played cricket into his eighties and added that:...he was prepared to back himself against any man in England ... in five manly sports - cricket, shooting, running, jumping and sparring. Though his celebrity was more especially for the first of the five, I have heard him say, "If there is one thing I can do better than another, it is the last-named."

His other interests included pig-keeping and tulip-growing.

Notes

1786 births
1875 deaths
Cricketers from Buckinghamshire
E. H. Budd's XI cricketers
English cricketers of 1787 to 1825
English cricketers of 1826 to 1863
English cricketers
Epsom cricketers
Gentlemen cricketers
George Osbaldeston's XI cricketers
Hampshire cricketers
Marylebone Cricket Club cricketers
Middlesex cricketers
Non-international England cricketers
Norfolk cricketers
People from Great Missenden
The Bs cricketers
William Ward's XI cricketers
Marylebone Cricket Club Second 10 with 1 Other cricketers
Marylebone Cricket Club Second 9 with 3 Others cricketers